Oksana Alexandrovna Domnina (born 17 August 1984) is a Russian former competitive ice dancer. She and partner Maxim Shabalin are the 2010 Olympic bronze medalists, the 2009 World Champions, the 2008 & 2010 European Champions, the 2007 Grand Prix Final champions, and three-time (2005, 2007, 2010) Russian national champions.

Career
Domnina began skating at the age of six in Kirov and took up ice dancing two years later due to her height. Early in her career, she competed with Ivan Lobanov and Maxim Bolotin.

Partnership with Shabalin
Domnina was paired with Maxim Shabalin in May 2002 by coach Alexei Gorshkov. In their first season together, they won every junior level competition they entered, including the 2002–03 Junior Grand Prix Final and the 2003 World Junior Championships.

Shabalin sustained a meniscus injury in spring 2007 and had surgery on his right knee in May. They initially worked on a free dance to Schindler's List but when they wanted to add a faster section they thought it looked too much like a hodgepodge; after consultation with Tatiana Tarasova, they began working on a new free dance to Masquerade Waltz at the start of August. In September 2007, Shabalin also had surgery due to appendicitis. He then had problems with his left knee and had another operation in December. He returned to win the 2008 Europeans but limped off the ice. The pain persisted despite therapy, preventing them from training fully and resulting in their withdrawal from the 2008 World Championships. Shabalin spent five weeks in treatment in Munich, Germany, while Domnina trained on her own in Odintsovo, near Moscow.

In June 2008, Domnina/Shabalin announced they were leaving their longtime coach Alexei Gorshkov and moving from Russia to the United States to train with husband-and-wife coaches Natalia Linichuk and Gennadi Karponosov at the IceWorks Skating Complex in Aston, Pennsylvania. Domnina said they had been very comfortable in Odintsovo and it was a difficult decision to make. The move was considered surprising as their rivals Tanith Belbin / Benjamin Agosto had also moved to the same coaches a couple months prior, but Domnina said the competition at the rink was stimulating.

Domnina/Shabalin won the silver medal at the 2008–09 Grand Prix Final, and then took gold at 2009 Worlds. Afterwards, Shabalin returned to Germany for another four months of therapy on his left knee. They missed the 2009–10 Grand Prix series as a result of his knee problems. They resumed training in November 2009. Shabalin decided to use a brace in practice and competition to limit the movement and protect his knee.

Their original dance based on Australian Aboriginal folk dances sparked controversy in early 2010. Australian Aboriginal leaders were offended by the dance. Domnina/Shabalin said they meant no disrespect and would do the dance at the Olympics. When it was first skated at the 2010 Russian Championships, they wore face makeup but removed it for the 2010 European Championships. Domnina/Shabalin won the bronze medal at the 2010 Olympics and withdrew from the World Championships as a result of continued problems with his knee. They decided not to compete during the 2010–11 season to allow Shabalin to fully recover. In July 2010, Domnina announced on the team's official site that she was not ready to retire, despite the insistence of her mother and boyfriend to leave the sport, and that a decision would be made in 2011. She also denied rumors suggesting she would team up with Roman Kostomarov but added "Never say never."

Personal life
Oksana Domnina was born on 17 August 1984 in Kirov, Kirov Oblast, Russian SFSR, Soviet Union. She studied psychology. In August 2010, it was reported that Domnina was engaged to Russian ice dancer Roman Kostomarov, the 2006 Olympic champion, and expecting their first child together. Their daughter, Anastasia, was born on 2 January 2011. They married in April 2014. Their son, Ilya, was born in January 2016.

Programs

With Shabalin

With Bolotin

Competitive highlights 
GP: Grand Prix; JGP: Junior Grand Prix

With Shabalin

With Bolotin

With Lobanov

References

External links 

 
 Care to Ice Dance? – Domnina / Shabalin
 

1984 births
Living people
Sportspeople from Kirov, Kirov Oblast
Russian female ice dancers
Olympic figure skaters of Russia
Figure skaters at the 2006 Winter Olympics
Figure skaters at the 2010 Winter Olympics
Olympic bronze medalists for Russia
Olympic medalists in figure skating
World Figure Skating Championships medalists
European Figure Skating Championships medalists
World Junior Figure Skating Championships medalists
Medalists at the 2010 Winter Olympics
Season-end world number one figure skaters